A list of Turkish films released in 2023.

January–March

See also
 2023 in Turkey
 List of 2023 box office number-one films in Turkey

References

Film
2023
Lists of 2023 films by country or language